324 km is a rural locality (a settlement) in Troitskoye Rural Settlement of Izhmorsky District, Russia. The population was 0 as of 2010.

Streets 
There is no streets with titles.

Geography 
324 km is located 26 km southeast of Izhmorsky (the district's administrative centre) by road.

References 

Rural localities in Kemerovo Oblast